Maran or Marran in Iran may refer to:
Maran, Hamadan (ماران - Mārān), a village in Hamadan Province, Iran
Maran, Isfahan (ماران - Mārān), a village in Isfahan Province, Iran
Maran, Kerman (ماران - Mārān), a village in Kerman Province, Iran
Maran, Jiroft (ماران - Mārān), a village in Kerman Province, Iran
Maran, Kamyaran (ماران - Mārān), a village in Kurdistan Province, Iran
Maran-e Olya (مران - Marān), a village in Kurdistan Province, Iran
Maran-e Sofla (مران - Marān), a village in Kurdistan Province, Iran
Maran, Markazi (مران - Marān), a village in Markazi Province, Iran
Maran, Mazandaran (مران - Marān), a village in Mazandaran Province, Iran